Venomous animals are those that secrete venom.

Venomous may also refer to:

Arts and entertainment
 Venomous (album), by Burgerkill, 2011
 The Venomous, an album by Nightrage, 2017
 Venomous, an album by Skinlab, 2019
 Venomous (film), a 2001 American film directed by Fred Olen Ray
 Professor Venomous, a fictional character in the TV series OK K.O.! Let's Be Heroes

Other uses
 HMS Venomous, a Royal Navy destroyer
 VeNoMouS, New Zealand member of the hacktivist group milw0rm

See also
 
 Venom (disambiguation)